Albert Wayne Coy  (November 23, 1903 – September 24, 1957) served as chairman of the Federal Communications Commission from December 29, 1947, to February 21, 1952.

During World War II, he served as a Liaison Officer for the Office for Emergency Management, and as a special assistant to President Franklin Delano Roosevelt.

References

Brief profile of Wayne Coy

External links

1903 births
1957 deaths
Chairmen of the Federal Communications Commission
Indiana Democrats
Truman administration personnel